Goran Obradović (born 29 January 1971) is an athletic coach and works in Athletic Club Vojvodina from Novi Sad. Also he is the president of the board of experts at Athletic Federation Of Serbia.

Career
He started doing athletics in 1982 at Athletic club Vojvodina, Novi Sad. His main discipline was high jump and his best results were national vicechampion in 1991 and 1992.
He became a coach fairly early, at the age of 24. He studied at the University of Physical Culture in Novi Sad and at the Sports Academy in Belgrade. His first coaching successes have been with his jumping team Stevan Zorić high jump, Đorđe Niketić high jump, Marko Milinkov long jump, Feđa Kamasi pole vault, who were the contestants in most of the major athletic competitions. In 2005 he created the first multi event team in Serbia with his colleague Feđa Kamasi. This team has produced many decathletes, and some of them become known worldwide. Mihail Dudaš, a big competitor and winner of many medals, Igor Šarčević and Slobodan Matijević, along with decathlon, they trained for the bob sleigh and qualified for the 2010 Winter Olympic Games in Vancouver. Dino Dodig and Darko Pešić are the decathletes from the most recent generation of athletes.

Obradović  achieved his greatest results with Ivana Španović, a long jumper. Since 2013, they have won 14 major medals. The most important ones include the IAAF World Championships medal in Moscow 2013, which was the first medal of its kind in the history of Serbia, the Olympic medal at 2016 Summer Olympics in Rio for her country after 60 years and the first Global gold medal for Serbia at the IAAF World Indoor Championships in Birmingham 2018.

In 2022 Ivana become World Indoor Champion, European Champion and Diamond League Trophy winner. 

With his athletes he has won the most global medals for Serbia. He has received many awards: "Majska nagrada"  the greatest national award in the field of sports, The best Athletic Coach of The Year – for years 2014, 2015, 2016, 2017, 2018, 2019, 2021, 2022. The Best Sports Coach in town – for years 2013, 2014, 2015, 2016, 2017, 2018, "Jovan Mikić Spartak"  the greatest Vojvodina province award in the field of sports.

References

External links
 Goran Obradović, Topsrbija 2013 (in Serbian)
 Goran Obradović, Oradio 2017 (in Serbian)
 Goran Obradović, Novosti 2018 (in Serbian)
 Goran Obradović i BMW, AutoBlog 2017 (in Serbian)
 Goran Obradović traži 7m, Moj Novi Sad 2015 (in Serbian)
 High Jump Approach, Simon Hunt 2012
 Reward, IBNA
 The long jump conundrum, AIPS Media
 Surprise, Telegraf
 Tonus, Athletcs Weekly

Living people
1971 births
Sportspeople from Novi Sad
Serbian sports coaches